Bright Lights may refer to:

Film and television
 Bright Lights (1916 film), a silent short starring Fatty Arbuckle
 Bright Lights (1925 film), an MGM film starring Charles Ray and directed by Robert Z. Leonard
 Bright Lights (1928 film), a Disney silent animated short
 Bright Lights (1930 film), a musical comedy shot in Technicolor
 Bright Lights (1935 film), a film starring Joe E. Brown and Ann Dvorak
 Bright Lights, a 1924 film featuring Jay Belasco
 Bright Lights, a 2006 short film featuring Hanna R. Hall
 "Bright Lights", a 1986 four-part serial in the children's TV series My Little Pony
 Bright Lights Film Journal, an online journal of film criticism
 Bright Lights: Starring Carrie Fisher and Debbie Reynolds, a 2016 documentary

Music
 Bright Lights (Susanna Hoffs album), a 2021 album of covers by Susanna Hoffs
 "Bright Lights" (Tinchy Stryder song), 2012
 Bright Lights, the re-release of Lights by Ellie Goulding
 The Bright Lights, an EP by This Providence
 Bright Lights, the alias and album project of Heather Bright
 "Bright Lights" (Matchbox Twenty song), 2003
 "Bright Lights" (Placebo song), 2010
 "Bright Lights", a song by Thirty Seconds to Mars from the 2013 album Love, Lust, Faith and Dreams
 "Bright Lights", a song by Gary Clark, Jr. from the 2012 album Blak and Blu
 The Brightlights, British indie rock band

See also 
 Bright Light (disambiguation)
 Bright Lights, Big City (disambiguation)